Doliornis is a small genus of bird in the family Cotingidae. Established by Władysław Taczanowski in 1874, it contains two species:

The name Deliornis is a combination of the Greek words dolios. meaning "crafty" or "wily" and ornis, meaning "bird".

References

 
Bird genera
Taxonomy articles created by Polbot